Reginald Shon Jackson (born April 16, 1990) is an American professional basketball player for the Denver Nuggets of the National Basketball Association (NBA). He played three seasons for the Boston College Eagles before declaring for the 2011 NBA draft, where he was drafted 24th overall by the Oklahoma City Thunder.

Early life
Jackson was born in Pordenone, in northeast Italy, to American parents. Jackson's father served at Aviano Air Base. The Jacksons later moved to England before going to the United States when Jackson was five. The family lived in North Dakota for a year before moving to Georgia and Florida before settling in Colorado Springs, Colorado when Jackson was in sixth grade. He graduated from General William J. Palmer High School in Colorado Springs in 2008, and won the 2007–08 Gatorade Colorado Boys' Basketball Player of the Year. In April 2008, Jackson officially declared as an American citizen and relinquished his Italian citizenship.

Considered a three-star recruit by Rivals.com, Jackson was listed as the No. 29 shooting guard and the No. 115 player in the nation in 2008.

College career

Jackson arrived at Boston College and joined a team that was already armed with stars such as Tyrese Rice and Rakim Sanders. In Jackson's freshman season, the Eagles made the NCAA Tournament with Jackson being used as an explosive weapon off the bench. In his second season, Jackson stepped into a starting role following the departure of Rice, but the Eagles were unable to make it back to the NCAA Tournament. As a junior in 2010–11, he led the Eagles in scoring with 18.2 points per game and led them to the National Invitation Tournament. He subsequently earned first-team All-ACC honors alongside Nolan Smith, Jordan Williams, Malcolm Delaney and Kyle Singler. After his junior season, Jackson declared for the NBA draft.

Professional career

Oklahoma City Thunder (2011–2015)

Jackson saw limited action in his first season with the Oklahoma City Thunder, averaging just 11.1 minutes over 45 games playing behind Russell Westbrook and Eric Maynor. He scored over three points per game but shot only 32% from the field, and that percentage dropped to 21% when Jackson took shots beyond the arc. He did not play in any of the Thunder's 20 playoff games in 2012 as the Thunder lost to the Miami Heat 4 games to 1 in the NBA Finals.

Jackson was assigned multiple times to the Tulsa 66ers of the NBA Development League between March and December 2012.

As a sophomore during the 2012–13 season, Jackson's minutes and production steadily increased. In Game 2 of the Thunder's first round playoff series against the Houston Rockets, starting point guard Russell Westbrook tore his meniscus and was ruled out for the rest of the season, as Jackson was promoted to a starting role. In his first career start, he had 14 points, 2 rebounds and 1 assist, helping the Thunder win Game 3. As a starter during the playoffs, Jackson averaged 15.3 points, 5.3 rebounds and 4.7 assists per game.

On February 6, 2014, Jackson was chosen to compete in the 2014 Taco Bell Skills Challenge. On April 26, 2014, he recorded a career-high 32 points along with 9 rebounds against the Memphis Grizzlies in Game 4 of the 2014 NBA Playoffs first round series, which the Thunder won 92–89. Jackson had 5 points in the final minute of regulation to force overtime, but heaved a shot from full court, still with 4 seconds left. In overtime, Jackson hit four free throws to ensure a Thunder victory. He was praised for his performance as the Thunder's star players Kevin Durant and Russell Westbrook had off shooting nights.

On November 11, 2014, Jackson scored a season-high 29 points on 12-of-21 shooting in the 78–85 loss to the Milwaukee Bucks.

Detroit Pistons (2015–2020)
On February 19, 2015, Jackson was traded to the Detroit Pistons as part of a three-team deal that also involved the Utah Jazz. Three days later, he made his debut for the Pistons as he recorded 17 points, 5 rebounds and 5 assists in a 106–89 win over the Washington Wizards. On March 17, Jackson recorded 23 points and a career-high 20 assists in a 105–95 win over the Memphis Grizzlies. On March 27, Jackson recorded his second career triple-double just ten days later. Jackson finished the game with 26 points, 11 rebounds and ten assists in a 111–97 win over the Orlando Magic. Jackson became the first Pistons guard to record multiple triple-doubles in a season since Isiah Thomas during the 1986–87 season, and the first Pistons player to do so since Grant Hill during the 1997–98 season.

On July 20, 2015, the Pistons re-signed Jackson to a five-year, $80 million contract. On November 8, 2015, he recorded a career-high 40 points in a 120–103 win over the Portland Trail Blazers. He scored 26 of his 40 points in the fourth quarter, tying Will Bynum's franchise record for the most points in a quarter. On December 2, he had a season-best game with 34 points and 16 assists in a 127–122 overtime win over the Phoenix Suns. He was subsequently named the Eastern Conference Player of the Week for the week ending December 6. He averaged 27.0 points and 8.8 assists, leading the Pistons to four consecutive wins during that time. Jackson became the first Piston to record 30-plus points and 15-plus assists in a game since Isiah Thomas recorded 40-plus points and 17 assists in 1988. Jackson was named the Eastern Conference Player of the Week for the week ending December 20, 2015. He joined Andre Drummond as the only Pistons teammates to win the award twice in the same season. Jackson averaged 29.3 points (first in the Eastern Conference), 7.7 assists (second in the Eastern Conference), and 6.3 rebounds while helping lead the Pistons to a 2–1 record for the week against three teams with above .500 records. He shot 46% from the field, 38% from behind the arc and 83% from the free-throw line. Jackson recorded two 30/10 games with 34 points and a season-high 11 rebounds against the Los Angeles Clippers on December 14 and 31 points and 13 assists in a quadruple overtime win against the Chicago Bulls on December 18. He scored 13 of the Pistons' 20 points in the deciding fourth overtime period. On April 8, 2016, he had 39 points and nine assists to help the Pistons defeat the Washington Wizards and clinch a spot in the postseason for the first time since 2009. The Pistons finished the regular season as the eighth seed in the Eastern Conference with a 44–38 record. However, in their first-round series against the first-seeded Cleveland Cavaliers, the Pistons were swept 4–0.

On October 10, 2016, Jackson received platelet-rich plasma (PRP) injections to treat left knee tendinosis and an ulnar collateral ligament (UCL) sprain of his right thumb. He was subsequently ruled out for six to eight weeks. After missing the first 21 games of the 2016–17 season, he made his season debut for the Pistons on December 4, scoring 18 points in 23 minutes against the Orlando Magic. On March 6, 2017, he scored 24 of his 26 points in the second half of the Pistons' 109–95 win over the Chicago Bulls. He made all 10 of his field goal attempts after halftime.

On December 26, 2017, in a game against the Indiana Pacers, Jackson suffered a Grade 3 right ankle sprain and was subsequently ruled out for six-to-eight weeks. He returned to action on March 20, 2018, after missing 24 games. He scored seven points on 3-of-7 shooting in 15 minutes as a starter in a 115–88 win over the Phoenix Suns.

On February 2, 2019, Jackson scored 29 points in a 111–101 loss to the Clippers. On February 22, he scored a season-high 32 points in a 125–122 win over the Atlanta Hawks.

On February 18, 2020, Jackson was waived by the Pistons after a contract buyout agreement was reached.

Los Angeles Clippers (2020–2023)
On February 20, 2020, Jackson signed a one-year contract with the Los Angeles Clippers. On December 1, 2020, Jackson re-signed with the Clippers.

On June 18, 2021, Jackson in the starting lineup with Paul George, Patrick Beverley, and Terance Mann led the Clippers to their first Western Conference Finals appearance. In Game 6, Jackson scored 27 points, but the Clippers lost in six games to the Phoenix Suns. Jackson averaged 17.8 points, 3.2 rebounds and 3.4 assists in the postseason.

On August 11, 2021, Jackson re-signed with the Clippers on a two-year contract. On November 23, 2021, Jackson scored 31 points and grabbed 10 rebounds in a loss against the Dallas Mavericks. On December 11, Jackson scored 25 points, including a game-winning basket with 2.2 seconds left in a 106-104 victory over the Magic. On February 26, 2022, Jackson scored 25 points and grabbed 8 rebounds, along with making a game-winning layup with 4.1 seconds remaining, in a 111-110 win over the Los Angeles Lakers.

On November 29, 2022, Jackson scored 24 points, recorded 12 assists, and grabbed 7 rebounds during a 118–112 win over the Portland Trail Blazers.

On February 9, 2023, Jackson and a future second-round pick were traded to the Charlotte Hornets in exchange for Mason Plumlee. Three days later, Jackson and the Hornets reached a contract buyout agreement.

Denver Nuggets (2023–present)
On February 14, 2023, Jackson signed with the Denver Nuggets.

Career statistics

NBA

Regular season

|-
| style="text-align:left;"|
| style="text-align:left;"|Oklahoma City
| 45 || 0 || 11.1 || .321 || .210 || .862 || 1.2 || 1.6 || .6 || .0 || 3.1
|-
| style="text-align:left;"|
| style="text-align:left;"|Oklahoma City
| 70 || 0 || 14.2 || .458 || .231 || .839 || 2.4 || 1.7 || .4 || .2 || 5.3
|-
| style="text-align:left;"|
| style="text-align:left;"|Oklahoma City
| 80 || 36 || 28.5 || .440 || .339 || .893 || 3.9 || 4.1 || 1.1 || .1 || 13.1
|-
| style="text-align:left;"|
| style="text-align:left;"|Oklahoma City
| 50 || 13 || 28.0 || .432 || .278 || .861 || 4.0 || 4.3 || .8 || .1 || 12.8
|-
| style="text-align:left;"|
| style="text-align:left;"|Detroit
| 27 || 27 || 32.2 || .436 || .337 || .796 || 4.7 || 9.2 || .8 || .1 || 17.6
|-
| style="text-align:left;"|
| style="text-align:left;"|Detroit
| 79 || 79 || 30.7 || .434 || .353 || .864 || 3.2 || 6.2 || .7 || .1 || 18.8
|-
| style="text-align:left;"|
| style="text-align:left;"|Detroit
| 52 || 50 || 27.4 || .420 || .359 || .868 || 2.2 || 5.2 || .7 || .1 || 14.5
|-
| style="text-align:left;"|
| style="text-align:left;"|Detroit
| 45 || 45 || 26.7 || .426 || .308 || .836 || 2.8 || 5.3 || .6 || .1 || 14.6
|-
| style="text-align:left;"|
| style="text-align:left;"|Detroit
| 82 || 82 || 27.9 || .421 || .369 || .864 || 2.6 || 4.2 || .7 || .1 || 15.4
|-
| style="text-align:left;"|
| style="text-align:left;"|Detroit
| 14 || 10 || 27.2 || .384 || .378 || .788 || 2.9 || 5.1 || .7 || .1 || 14.9
|-
| style="text-align:left;"|
| style="text-align:left;"|L.A. Clippers
| 17 || 6 || 21.3 || .453 || .413 || .905 || 3.0 || 3.2 || .3 || .2 || 9.5
|-
| style="text-align:left;"|
| style="text-align:left;"|L.A. Clippers
| 67 || 43 || 23.0 || .450 || .433 || .817 || 2.9 || 3.1 || .6 || .1 || 10.7
|-
| style="text-align:left;"|
| style="text-align:left;"|L.A. Clippers
| 75 || 75 || 31.2 || .392 || .326 || .847 || 3.6 || 4.8 || .7 || .2 || 16.8
|-
| style="text-align:left;"|
| style="text-align:left;"|L.A. Clippers
| 52 || 38 || 25.7 || .418 || .350 || .924 || 2.2 || 3.5 || .7 || .1 || 10.9
|- class="sortbottom"
| style="text-align:center;" colspan="2"|Career
| 755 || 504 || 25.6 || .423 || .345 || .857 || 3.0 || 4.2 || .7 || .1 || 12.9

Playoffs

|-
| style="text-align:left;"|2013
| style="text-align:left;"|Oklahoma City
| 11 || 9 || 33.5 || .479 || .302 || .897 || 4.9 || 3.6 || .5 || .5 || 13.9
|-
| style="text-align:left;"|2014
| style="text-align:left;"|Oklahoma City
| 19 || 4 || 27.9 || .466 || .396 || .886 || 3.8 || 2.4 || .3 || .2 || 11.1
|-
| style="text-align:left;"|2016
| style="text-align:left;"|Detroit
| 4 || 4 || 36.8 || .455 || .167 || 1.000 || 3.3 || 9.3 || 1.5 || .5 || 14.3
|-
| style="text-align:left;"|2019
| style="text-align:left;"|Detroit
| 4 || 4 || 27.0 || .431 || .429 || .857 || 3.3 || 7.0 || .8 || .0 ||17.8
|-
| style="text-align:left;"|2020
| style="text-align:left;"|L.A. Clippers
| 12 || 1 || 14.2 || .438 || .531 || .000 || 1.8 || .9 || .2 || .1 || 4.9
|-
| style="text-align:left;"|2021
| style="text-align:left;"|L.A. Clippers
| 19 || 17 || 32.7 || .484 || .408 || .878 || 3.2 || 3.4 || .9 || .2 || 17.8
|- class="sortbottom"
| style="text-align:center;" colspan="2"|Career
| 69 || 39 || 28.2 || .469 || .392 || .888 || 3.4 || 3.3 || .6 || .2 || 12.9

College

|-
| style="text-align:left;"|2008–09
| style="text-align:left;"|Boston College
| 34 || 0 || 20.0 || .440 || .273 || .685 || 3.3 || 1.7 || .8 || .4 || 7.0
|-
| style="text-align:left;"|2009–10
| style="text-align:left;"|Boston College
| 31 || 20 || 30.1 || .430 || .291 || .733 || 5.7 || 4.5 || .6 || .5 || 12.9
|-
| style="text-align:left;"|2010–11
| style="text-align:left;"|Boston College
| 34 || 32 || 34.1 || .503 || .420 || .796 || 4.3 || 4.5 || 1.1 || .5 || 18.2
|- class="sortbottom"
| style="text-align:center;" colspan="2"|Career
| 99 || 52 || 28.0 || .465 || .351 || .753 || 4.4 || 3.5 || .8 || .5 || 12.7

Personal life

Nickname 
Jackson earned the nicknames “Root Canal”,  "Big Government" and “Mr. June” from fans during his Clippers tenure due to his ability to "bail them out" with clutch performances, especially in the postseason.

References

External links

1990 births
Living people
American men's basketball players
Basketball players from Colorado Springs, Colorado
Boston College Eagles men's basketball players
Detroit Pistons players
Los Angeles Clippers players
Oklahoma City Thunder draft picks
Oklahoma City Thunder players
People from Pordenone
Point guards
Sportspeople from Friuli-Venezia Giulia
Tulsa 66ers players